United Nations Security Council Resolution 246, adopted unanimously on March 14, 1968, after reaffirming previous resolution of the topic of the independence of South West Africa and the rights of its people, the Council censured the government of South Africa and demanded they release and repatriate the South West African prisoners in their custody.  The Council also decided that if South Africa failed to comply with the previous and present resolutions the Council would meet immediately to determine effective steps or measures in conformity with the relevant provisions of the Charter of the United Nations.

See also
History of Namibia
List of United Nations Security Council Resolutions 201 to 300 (1965–1971)

References
Text of the Resolution at undocs.org

External links
 

 0246
20th century in South Africa
 0246
 0246
March 1968 events